Munah (also Romanized as Mūnah and Mūneh) is a village in Tayebi-ye Garmsiri-ye Shomali Rural District, in the Central District of Landeh County, Kohgiluyeh and Boyer-Ahmad Province, Iran. At the 2006 census, its population was 551, in 111 families.

References 

Populated places in Landeh County